The ships of the French Navy have borne the name Dupuy de Lôme in honour of Henri Dupuy de Lôme:
 , an armoured cruiser of 1887
 , a submarine of 1916
 , an intelligence ship of 2006

French Navy ship names